The 1982–83 Pittsburgh Panthers men's basketball team represented the University of Pittsburgh in the 1982–83 NCAA Division I men's basketball season. Led by head coach Roy Chipman, the Panthers finished with a record of 13–15. This was Pitt's first season in the Big East Conference. They were previously members of the Eastern 8 Conference.

References

Pittsburgh Panthers men's basketball seasons
Pittsburgh
Pittsburgh Pan
Pittsburgh Pan